State Road 256 (SR 256) in the U.S. State of Indiana runs mostly through Scott and Jefferson counties, with short portions in Jackson and Washington counties. The western terminus is Indiana 39. The eastern terminus is Indiana 56 near Madison.

Route description 
SR 256 heads east from its western terminus toward Austin.  In Austin SR 256 has an interchange with Interstate 65 and then it has an intersection with U.S. Route 31.  After Austin SR 256 has an intersection with State Road 203.  Then SR 256 enters Jefferson County, where it has an intersection with State Road 3.  Then SR 256 has an eastern terminus at an intersection with State Road 62 and State Road 56.

Major intersections

References

External links

256
Transportation in Jackson County, Indiana
Transportation in Jefferson County, Indiana
Transportation in Scott County, Indiana
Transportation in Washington County, Indiana